Anders Folke Eriksson (27 April 1925 – 12 March 2008) was a Swedish water polo player who competed in the 1948 Summer Olympics.

In 1948 he was a member of the Swedish team which finished fifth in the water polo tournament. He played four matches.

See also
 Sweden men's Olympic water polo team records and statistics
 List of men's Olympic water polo tournament goalkeepers

References

External links
 

1925 births
2008 deaths
Swedish male water polo players
Water polo goalkeepers
Olympic water polo players of Sweden
Water polo players at the 1948 Summer Olympics